Grand Arts was a nonprofit contemporary art space in downtown Kansas City, Missouri, whose mission was to help national and international artists realize projects considered too risky, provocative or complex to otherwise attract support. It was co-founded by Margaret Silva and Sean Kelley in 1995 and operated until 2015 with sole funding from the Margaret Hall Silva Foundation.

Facilities included a 4,000-square-foot fabrication studio, exhibition spaces, offices, and an on-site apartment available for visiting artists.

History
Margaret Silva and Sean Kelley co-founded Grand Arts in 1995 to give artists "a place for radical experimentation, without the constraints of too little time and even less money". Kelley left Grand Arts in 2003. 

Stacy Switzer served as artistic director from 2004 until the gallery's close.

In total, Grand Arts produced 90 exhibitions with more than 120 artists. Projects often took years to produce, from concept to realization, and the organization's full-time staff tended to each phase of the process: research, design, fabrication, programming, publicity and beyond. Grand Arts' practice of long-term collaborative project development is in part what distinguished it from other granting organizations, according to Switzer: "That's what was special about the Grand Arts process. It wasn't that an artist would propose something and we would fabricate it according to the artist's specs. Often, there was a long conversation about how to push, pull, and tease the idea, pull out the most provocative threads and find other people in other fields who could help us enhance it in other ways".

Following exhibition, projects produced at Grand Arts belonged solely to the artist. The works were often then exhibited in museums, commercial galleries and/or art fairs. For example:
 Isaac Julien's 1999 Long Road to Mazatlan was co-produced by Grand Arts and ArtPace in 1999 and exhibited as one of two Julien works at Tate Britain in 2001, when the artist was short-listed for the Turner Prize.
 Patricia Cronin's  Memorial to a Marriage, a three-ton marble mortuary statue produced by Grand Arts in 2002 and installed thereafter at Woodlawn Cemetery, has been shown in more than 35 exhibitions, including the Brooklyn Museum, Palmer Museum of Art, Neuberger Museum of Art, Contemporary Arts Center in Cincinnati, and the FLAG Art Foundation; and is in several museum collections, including Smithsonian National Portrait Gallery, in Washington, DC; Pérez Art Museum Miami; and Kelvingrove Art Gallery and Museum, in Glasgow, where it is on permanent view. 
 Sanford Biggers' Blossom, produced by Grand Arts in 2007, was acquired by the Brooklyn Museum in 2011.
 Laurel Nakadate's Stay the Same Never Change, produced by Grand Arts in 2008, was a selection at the 2009 Sundance Film Festival and then screened at MoMA’s New Directors/New Films series.
 William Pope.L's Trinket, produced by Grand Arts in 2008, was re-staged at the Museum of Contemporary Art, Los Angeles in 2015 and featured in a performance by Kendrick Lamar at the 2015 BET Awards. Christopher Knight writes in the Los Angeles Times: "Nearly seven years on, the sculpture still resonates."
 Cody Critcheloe/SSION's feature film BOY was produced by Grand Arts in 2010 and screened at Peres Projects, in Los Angeles and Berlin; Smart Museum of Art, in Chicago; Hole Gallery, in New York; and Vyktor Wynd Fine Art, in London.
 The Propeller Group's 2015 A Universe of Collisions — Grand Arts' last-ever show — was included in the Venice Biennale that year.

Upon Grand Arts' closing, Silva donated the building, a former auto shop located at 1819 Grand Boulevard, to the Kansas City Art Institute.

Exhibition timeline

Problems and Provocations: Grand Arts 1995-2015
In 2016, Grand Arts published Problems and Provocations: Grand Arts 1995-2015, co-edited by Stacy Switzer and Annie Fischer, with a foreword by Margaret Silva and an introduction by Switzer. 

The book chronicles 30 of Grand Arts' projects — works by figures including Alice Aycock, Alfredo Jaar, Isaac Julien, William Pope.L, Sanford Biggers, Laurel Nakadate, Stanya Kahn, and Tavares Strachan — with archival materials and project documentation presented alongside newly written anecdotes and reflections by artists and other collaborators. 

Essays by Pablo Helguera, Iain Kerr, Emily Roysdon, Gean Moreno and  Rob Walker consider the models, practices and ethics of art institutions. A critical study conducted by the research studio RHEI identifies and describes Grand Arts’ unorthodox organizational model.

Successor organization
In 2016, former Grand Arts associates Stacy Switzer, Lacey Wozny, Eric Dobbins and Annie Fischer relocated to Los Angeles to develop a new organization named Fathomers, similar in mission to Grand Arts but with a focus on long-term thinking and transdisciplinary practice. Fathomers' founding board members are Margaret Silva, Andrew Torrance and Glenn Kaino. The organization's first project is a seven-year collaboration with artist Michael Jones McKean.

References

Further reading
 Switzer, Stacy and Annie Fischer, ed. "Problems and Provocations: Grand Arts 1995-2015" (Kansas City: Grand Arts, 2016)

External links
 Grand Arts website
 Fathomers website

Public art in the United States 
Contemporary art galleries in the United States